Portrait is the first studio album released in 1971 by Filipino singer-actress Nora Aunor through Alpha Records Corporation in the Philippines in LP format and later released in 1999 in a compilation/ cd format.  The album contains some original Filipino compositions by Robert Medina, George Canseco and Danny Subido.  The album had a total of 12 tracks, many of which are identified with Nora Aunor despite them being covers like Dio Como Ti Amo (originally in Italian by Domenico Modugno of "Volare" fame),  True Picture (a Jack Jones original), Three Good Reasons (originally by Connie Francis) and  Theme for a New Love (by Monkees member Davy Jones). Davy Jones would star with Nora Aunor in Lollipops and Roses, a movie shot in the US that had Don Johnson in a featured role. Among the locally composed hits in the album was "Waiting For You" by George Canseco.

Track listing

Side One

Side Two

Album credits 
Arranged and conducted by:

 Doming Amarillo
 Waiting for You
 True Picture
 You Are
 Dio Como Ti Amo
 My Beloved
 Doming Valdez
 Three Good Reasons
 Around the World
 Theme for a New Love

Arranged and supervised by:
 Danny Subido
 Missing You
 Prisoner of My Eyes

Recording engineer
 Rick L. Santos

References

See also
 Nora Aunor Discography

Nora Aunor albums
1971 albums